Peterborough Greyhound Stadium was a greyhound racing track located in Fengate, less than a mile from the centre of Peterborough, England.

Racing at the stadium took place every Wednesday, Friday and Saturday night with racing starting at 7:30 pm.

On Tuesday 19 May 2020, the stadium announced that it would cease trading with immediate effect after 75 years.

Origins and opening
The Liberty of Peterborough was an historic area comprising around thirty parishes, and it was in 1931 that the Peterborough Racing Club opened their new greyhound track within the Liberty. The venue was described as being off Star Road which is misleading because although this is in the Fengate area the actual track was off the Fengate Road. The plot of land chosen for the track was in south-east Fengate directly north of Peterborough Corporation sewage pumping station. The opening night was on Saturday 4 April 1931, consisting of twelve races. The managing director was G Hooke and organised racing was held every Monday and Saturday which consisted mainly of greyhounds but also whippet races.

The first ever winner was a greyhound called 'Dewdrop'. The second meeting on Monday 6 April was recorded as being a record crowd for the area with 400 being present. Racing continued up until the war with a maximum capacity of 700 being able to attend the track. It is also reported that facilities were very basic with the hare still being moved around the track by the power of two men cycling.

History
After the war there was a major milestone for the track when Reg Perkins from a farming and transport business family and George Ellingworth a garage owner purchased the track in 1945 and quickly began to improve facilities. The purchase came at the right time because greyhound racing hit its peak in 1946 and it is known that one year later in 1947 the track had a totalisator turnover of £49,719. By this time it was also known as the Peterborough Sports Stadium and Reg Perkins took sole control several years later following the death of George Ellingworth.

The racing continued independent of the National Greyhound Racing Club (NGRC) but remained popular with the local population and by the sixties the stadium offered licensed bars and refreshments, photo finish apparatus and on course bookmakers and an 'Outside Sumner' hare. The immediate area also underwent major changes with industrial units appearing with frequent regularity and a road called First Drove serving as the entrance to the stadium.

In 1977 Reg Perkins retired leaving the day-to-day management to his sons Rex and David with racing on Tuesday and Saturday evenings at 7.15pm. Track distances at this time were 275, 475 & 675 yards and there were now nine track bookmakers. The second major milestone arrived in 1982 following the decision of the management to join the NGRC permit scheme that was in operation at the time. This allowed smaller tracks to run under NGRC rules at reduced rates and was the catalyst for Peterborough to improve in stature. In 1983 the Peterborough Derby was inaugurated and soon became a very popular event at the track. The stadium reputation began to grow and Rex Perkins was elected the Mayor of Peterborough from 1987 and with his wife Margaret raised thousands of pounds for charities.

Renovation
In 1988 grand plans were unveiled by local architects T. E. Titman Associates for a new grandstand and restaurant and following the completion of the half a million pounds project. The 'Raceview Restaurant' could seat 200 with a further 600 seats available on the glass fronted grandstand.

Recent history
John 'Ginger' McGee Sr. joined the track and the Irishman won Greyhound Trainer of the Year in 1991 whilst attached to Peterborough. In 1998 Racing Manager Mike Middle left the track to assist with a new track at Wisbech Greyhound Stadium and was replaced by Con Baker. On 24 March 1999 the stadium suffered severe damage when a fire spread from an adjoining warehouse and destroyed two bars, a tote booth and a 250-person seating area. The damage resulted in a six-month closure but the management remained positive and rebuilt and refurbished, re-opening on the 21 September 1999.

2003 was a pivotal year for the track because Rex Perkins died after a long illness and his son Richard and nephew Rob dedicated a new £3 million extension to his name. The raceview seating area could now hold 1,000 spectators and corporate boxes were also added. Peterborough dropped Tuesday night racing in 2008 and was rewarded with a Bookmakers Afternoon Greyhound Service (BAGS) contract in 2012. At the end of 2014 the track became BAGS national champions after defeating five other tracks in the final at Nottingham Greyhound Stadium.

In 2018 the stadium signed a deal with ARC to race every Wednesday evening.

Closure
The track closed due to the COVID-19 pandemic and when racing returned (18 May) following the lock-down Peterborough announced that they would not be re-opening until they sought further clarification from the Greyhound Board of Great Britain. The concerns over the financial implication of racing behind closed doors was evident and the following day (20 May) the Perkins family announced the permanent closure of the track.

Competitions

Peterborough Derby

(1983-2012 420 metres), (2013-2017 435 metres), (2014-16 & 2018 not held)

Peterborough Puppy Derby

(1992-2011 420 metres), (2016 435 metres), (1999 & 2012–2015, 2017-18 not Run)

Track records
Current

Previous

References

Sports venues completed in 1931
Buildings and structures in Peterborough
Defunct greyhound racing venues in the United Kingdom
Sport in Peterborough
2020 disestablishments in England